The 2009 European Drift Championship season is the third season of the European Drift Championship. The championship was won by Mark Luney after he narrow snatched the title from the then championship leader, Phil Morrison.

2009 entry list

2009 Rounds 
Round 1 – April 25, 2009 – Oulton Park Circuit – Won by Phil Morrison
Round 2 – May 17, 2009 Knockhill Circuit – Won by Pete Barber
Round 3 – May 31, 2009 Silverstone Circuit – Won by Alan McCord
Round 4 – June 28, 2009 Brands Hatch – Won by Mark Luney
Round 5 – July 11, 2009 – Santa Pod Raceway – Won by Phil Morrison
Round 6 – October 11, 2009 – Snetterton Circuit – Won by Mark Luney

European Drift Championship